Shut Up is the debut studio album by British singer-songwriter Kelly Osbourne. The album is a punk-rock/pop album, released by Epic Records. Released on 26 November 2002, the album was met with a mixed reception from music critics, however, the album was met with disappointing sales which led to her consequent drop from Epic Records. Shut Up was later re-released in 2003 as Changes, featuring her and her father Ozzy's cover of the Black Sabbath song "Changes". The album  features a cover of Madonna's song "Papa Don't Preach".

Reception
Shut Up received mixed reviews by critics. People magazine said "it takes a whole lot more than the right pedigree and the right haircut to make credible punk rock." The album had sold 155,000 copies in the U.S by 11 September 2003, according to Nielsen SoundScan.

Track listing
All songs written by Kelly Osbourne & PowerPack (Mike Beans Benigno, Chris Goer me, Tom Yezzi, Marc Russell), except where noted.
"Disconnected" – 3:52
"Come Dig Me Out" (Teddy Kumpel, Michelle Lewis) – 3:31
"Contradiction" – 3:14
"Coolhead" – 2:57
"Right Here" – 3:30
"Shut Up" – 2:47
"On the Run" – 2:41
"On Your Own" – 3:02
"Too Much of You" – 3:07 (Osbourne, Kara DioGuardi, Jonnie Most)
"Everything's Alright" – 2:40
"More Than Life Itself" – 4:25
"Papa Don't Preach" – 3:28 (Brian Elliot, Madonna)

Changes bonus tracks
 "Dig Me Out" (live) – 3:54
 "Disconnected" (live) – 4:07
 "Too Much of You" (live) – 3:34
 "On the Run" (live) – 4:12
 "Changes" (with Ozzy Osbourne) – 4:07 (Ozzy Osbourne, Tony Iommi, Geezer Butler, Bill Ward)

Personnel
Kelly Osbourne – vocals, vocal arrangements
Chris Goerce – Guitar
Mike "Beans" Benigno – Drums
Marc Russell – Bass

Production
Thomas R. Yezzi – production
Marc Russell – production
Ric Wake – production
J.D. Andrew – engineering
Andy Manganello – engineering
Jim Annunziato – engineering
Juan Francisco – engineering
Eric Sanicola – engineering
Dave Scheuer – engineering
Thomas R. Yezzi – recording, mixing
Vladimir Meller – mastering
Mark Weiss – photography

Chart positions

Album

Singles

References

2002 debut albums
Albums produced by Ric Wake
Epic Records albums
Kelly Osbourne albums